Dihydrotestosterone acetate, also known as androstanolone acetate or stanolone acetate, as well as 5α-dihydrotestosterone 17β-acetate, is a synthetic androgen and anabolic steroid and a dihydrotestosterone ester that was never marketed.

See also
 List of androgen esters § Dihydrotestosterone esters

References

Abandoned drugs
Acetate esters
Androgens and anabolic steroids
Androstanes
Dihydrotestosterone esters
Prodrugs